In the Western world, Persia (or one of its cognates) was historically the common name used for Iran. On the Nowruz of 1935, Reza Shah officially asked foreign delegates to use the Persian term Iran (meaning the land of Aryans in Persian), the endonym of the country, in formal correspondence. Subsequently, the common adjective for citizens of Iran changed from Persian to Iranian. In 1959, the government of Mohammad Reza Pahlavi, Reza Shah's son, announced that both "Persia" and "Iran" can be used interchangeably, in formal correspondence. However, the issue is still debated among Iranians.

Etymology of Iran

The name "Iran" is first attested in the Avesta as airyānąm (the text of which is composed in Avestan, an old Iranian language spoken in the northeastern part of Greater Iran, or in what are now Afghanistan, Turkmenistan, and Tajikistan).

It reappears in the Achaemenid period where the Elamite version of the Behistun Inscription twice mentions Ahura Mazda as nap harriyanam "the god of the Iranians". 

The Modern Persian word Īrān derives immediately from Middle Persian Ērān (Pahlavi spelling: ʼyrʼn), attested in a third century AD inscription that accompanies the investiture relief of the first Sassanid king Ardashir I at Naqsh-e Rustam. In this inscription, the king's Middle Persian appellation is ardašīr šāhān šāh ērān while in the Parthian language inscription that accompanies the Middle Persian one the king is titled ardašīr šāhān šāh aryān (Pahlavi: ... ʼryʼn) both meaning king of kings of Iranians.

The gentilic ēr- and ary- in ērān and aryān derives from Old Iranian *arya- (Old Persian airya-, Avestan airiia-, etc.), meaning "Aryan", in the sense of "of the Iranians". This term is attested as an ethnic designator in Achaemenid inscriptions and in Zoroastrianism's Avesta tradition, and it seems "very likely" that in Ardashir's inscription ērān still retained this meaning, denoting the people rather than the empire. 

Notwithstanding this inscriptional use of ērān to refer to the Iranian peoples, the use of ērān to refer to the empire (and the antonymic anērān to refer to the Roman territories) is also attested by the early Sassanid period. Both ērān and anērān appear in 3rd century calendrical text written by Mani. In an inscription of Ardashir's son and immediate successor, Shapur I "apparently includes in Ērān regions such as Armenia and the Caucasus which were not inhabited predominantly by Iranians". In Kartir's inscriptions (written thirty years after Shapur's), the high priest includes the same regions (together with Georgia, Albania, Syria and the Pontus) in his list of provinces of the antonymic Anērān. Ērān also features in the names of the towns founded by Sassanid dynasts, for instance in Ērān-xwarrah-šābuhr "Glory of Ērān (of) Shapur". It also appears in the titles of government officers, such as in Ērān-āmārgar "Accountant-General (of) Ērān" or Ērān-dibirbed "Chief Scribe (of) Ērān".

Etymology of "Persia"

Such words were taken from the Old Persian Pārsa – the name of the people from whom Cyrus the Great of the Achaemenid dynasty emerged and over whom he first ruled (before he inherited or conquered other Iranian Kingdoms). Thus, the term Persian is an exonym, and Iranians never historically referred to Iran by that exonym. The Pars tribe gave its name to the region where they lived (the modern day province is called Fars/Pars), but the province in ancient times was smaller than its current area. In Latin, the name for the whole empire was Persia, while the Iranians knew it as Iran or Iranshahr.

The Turks also were using bilad (Belaad) e Ajam an equivalent or synonym to the Persia and Iranian almost from oldest text that remained in Arabic, in Quran and jaheliya also the word ajam were used to refer to Persian. 

A Greek folk etymology connected the name to Perseus, a legendary character in Greek mythology. Herodotus recounts this story, devising a foreign son, Perses, from whom the Persians took the name. Apparently, the Persians themselves knew the story, as Xerxes I tried to use it to suborn the Argives during his invasion of Greece, but ultimately failed to do so.

Two names in the West
The exonym Persia was the official name of Iran in the Western world before March 1935, but the Iranian peoples inside their country since the time of Zoroaster (probably circa 1000 BC), or even before, have called their country Arya, Iran, Iranshahr, Iranzamin (Land of Iran), Aryānām (the equivalent of Iran in the proto-Iranian language) or its equivalents. The term Arya has been used by the Iranian people, as well as by the rulers and emperors of Iran, from the time of the Avesta. Evidently from the time of the Sassanids (226–651 CE) Iranians have called it Iran, meaning the "Land of the Aryans" and Iranshahr. In Middle Persian sources, the name Arya and Iran is used for the pre-Sassanid Iranian empires as well as the Sassanid empire. As an example, the use of the name "Iran" for Achaemenids in the Middle Persian book of Arda Viraf refers to the invasion of Iran by Alexander the Great in 330 BC. The Proto-Iranian term for Iran is reconstructed as *Aryānām (the genitive plural of the word *Arya); the Avestan equivalent is Airyanem (as in Airyanem Vaejah). The internal preference for "Iran" was noted in some Western reference books (e.g. the Harmsworth Encyclopaedia, circa 1907, entry for Iran: "The name is now the official designation of Persia.") but for international purposes, Persia was the norm.

In the mid 1930s, the ruler of the country, Reza Shah Pahlavi, moved towards formalising the name Iran instead of Persia for all purposes. In the British House of Commons the move was reported upon by the United Kingdom  Secretary of State for Foreign Affairs as follows:

The decree of Reza Shah Pahlavi affecting nomenclature duly took effect on 21 March 1935. 

To avoid confusion between the two neighboring countries of Iran and Iraq, which were both involved in WWII and occupied by the Allies, Winston Churchill requested from the Iranian government during the Tehran Conference for the old and distinct name "Persia to be used by the United Nations [i.e., the Allies] for the duration of the common War". His request was approved immediately by the Iranian Foreign Ministry. The Americans, however, continued using Iran as they then had little involvement in Iraq to cause any such confusion.

In the summer of 1959, following concerns that the native name had, as one politician put it, "turned a known into an unknown", a committee was formed, led by noted scholar Ehsan Yarshater, to consider the issue again. They recommended a reversal of the 1935 decision, and Mohammad Reza Pahlavi approved this. However, the implementation of the proposal was weak, simply allowing Persia and Iran to be used interchangeably.  Today, both terms are common; Persia mostly in historical and cultural contexts, "Iran" mostly in political contexts.

In recent years most exhibitions of Persian history, culture and art in the world have used the exonym Persia (e.g., "Forgotten Empire; Ancient Persia", British Museum; "7000 Years of Persian Art", Vienna, Berlin; and "Persia; Thirty Centuries of Culture and Art", Amsterdam). In 2006, the largest collection of historical maps of Iran, entitled Historical Maps of Persia, was published in the Netherlands.

Recent debate 

In the 1980s, Professor Ehsan Yarshater (editor of the Encyclopædia Iranica) started to publish articles on this matter (in both English and Persian) in Rahavard Quarterly, Pars Monthly, Iranian Studies Journal, etc. After him, a few Iranian scholars and researchers such as Prof. Kazem Abhary,  and Prof. Jalal Matini followed the issue. Several times since then, Iranian magazines and websites have published articles from those who agree or disagree with usage of Persia and Persian in English.

There are many Iranians in the West who prefer Persia and Persian as the English names for the country and nationality, similar to the usage of La Perse/persan in French. According to Hooman Majd, the popularity of the term Persia among the Iranian diaspora stems from the fact that Persia' connotes a glorious past they would like to be identified with, while 'Iran' since 1979 revolution… says nothing to the world but Islamic fundamentalism."

Official names
Since 1 April 1979, the official name of the Iranian state is Jomhuri-ye Eslâmi-ye Irân, which is generally translated as the Islamic Republic of Iran in English.

Other official names were Dowlat-e Aliyye-ye Irân meaning the Sublime State of Persia and Kešvar-e Šâhanšâhi-ye Irân meaning  Imperial State of Persia and the Imperial State of Iran after 1935.

See also
Iran (word)

Bibliography
 The History of the Idea of Iran, A. Shapur Shahbazi in Birth of the Persian Empire by V. S. Curtis and S. Stewart, 2005,

Notes

References

External links
 Publication of General Maps of Persia (Iran) in The Netherlands at payvand.com
 The names of Iran in the course of history at hamshahrionline.ir
 Iran and Persia- Are they the same? at heritageinstitute.com

Iran
History of Iran
Iran
1935 in international relations